The Längfluh (also spelled Längflue) is a rocky outcrop of the Pennine Alps, dividing the Fee Glacier above Saas Fee in the canton of Valais.

The Längfluh is accessible by cable car and is part of a ski area.

References

External links
 Längfluh saas-fee.ch

Mountains of the Alps
Mountains of Switzerland
Mountains of Valais
Two-thousanders of Switzerland